This is a list of notable Nicaraguan Americans, including both original immigrants who obtained American citizenship and their American descendants. 

To be included in this list, the person must have a Wikipedia article showing they are Nicaraguan American or must have references showing they are Nicaraguan American and are notable.

List
Annette A. Aguilar, American percussionist, bandleader, and music educator
  Horacio Aguirre Baca, founder of Diario Las Americas of Miami, Florida 
Roberto Aguirre-Sacasa, American playwright, screenwriter and comic-book writer
Patrick Argüello, considered a martyr of the Popular Front for the Liberation of Palestine
Marvin Benard, Major League Baseball player
Maurice Benard, actor on American soap operas All My Children and General Hospital
 Carolina Bermudez, radio personality on Elvis Duran and the Morning Show in New York on WHTZ
Alex Blandino, Major League Baseball player 
Bella Blue, burlesque dancer
T-Bone, rapper
 Randy Caballero, undefeated Nicaraguan American professional boxer in the Featherweight division
Róger Calero, ran for U.S. President in the 2004 elections*
 Barbara Carrera, Nicaraguan-born American film and television actress
 Oswaldo Castillo, gardener/construction worker-turned-actor.
Michael Cordúa, restaurateur, entrepreneur, businessman, award winning self-taught chef
DJ Craze, only DJ in history to win 3 consecutive World DMC Champion titles
Miguel D'Escoto, Roman Catholic priest and former foreign minister
Omar D'Leon, painter and poet
Salomón de la Selva, poet, author of Tropical Town and Other Poems
Edward'O, astronalyst and co-host of 12 Corazones
Bill Guerin, NHL player (mother from Nicaragua)
 Ricardo Hurtado, American actor (School of Rock)
Bianca Jagger, human rights advocate and ex-wife of Mick Jagger
Diana López, Olympic bronze medalist in the sport of taekwondo
Mark López, Olympic silver medalist in the sport of taekwondo
Steven López, two time Olympic gold medalist in the sport of taekwondo
Dennis Martínez, first Nicaraguan-American to be a major league baseball pitcher or player
Camilo Mejía, former Staff Sergeant of the Florida National Guard and anti-war activist
Tony Meléndez, singer, composer, writer and musician who was born with no arms
Christianne Meneses Jacobs, publisher of the U.S.'s only Spanish-language children's magazine
Franck de Las Mercedes, painter
Ana Navarro, Republican strategist and political commentator
David Obregon, professional boxer
Horacio Peña, professor, writer, and poet
Eddy Piñeiro, NFL placekicker
Claudia Poll, Nicaraguan born swimmer
Silvia Poll, Nicaraguan born swimmer
Hope Portocarrero, former First Lady of Nicaragua (1967–1972)
 Anastasio Somoza Portocarrero, son of former Nicaraguan president Anastasio Somoza Debayle and Hope Portocarrero de Somoza
James Quesada, anthropologist and professor
Mari Ramos, weather anchor for CNN
Michele Richardson, competition swimmer and Olympic silver medalist
Tammy Rivera, singer and television personality
J Smooth, bilingual hip hop and reggaeton singer
Hilda Solis, U.S. congresswoman. She is of Mexican and Nicaraguan descent
Eve Torres, professional wrestler with WWE
Torombolo, reggaeton singer
Gabriela Revilla, Writer, Producer, Director 
Gabriel Traversari, actor, director, writer, singer, songwriter and painter
Guillermo Wagner Granizo (1923–1995), ceramic tile muralist in Northern California, his mother was from Nicaragua. 
Donald Vega, jazz musician and composer
Theo Von, comedian
Benny Urquidez, kickboxer, martial arts choreographer. His father was born in Granada, Nicaragua.

References

See also
 Nicaraguan American
 List of Nicaraguans

Nicaraguan Americans

Americans
Nicaraguan Americans
Nicaraguan